Fourth Republic may refer to:

Governments

Africa
 Fourth Republic of Uganda, since 1986
 Fourth Republic of Ghana, since 1993
 Fourth Republic of Niger, 1996–1999
 Fourth Nigerian Republic, since 1999
 Fourth Republic of Madagascar, since 2010

Americas
 Fourth Republic of Venezuela, 1953–1999
 Fourth Brazilian Republic, 1946–1964
 Fourth Dominican Republic, since 1965

Asia
 Fourth Republic of Korea, 1972–1981
 Fourth Philippine Republic, 1972–1986

Europe
 French Fourth Republic (1946–1958)

Other uses
4th Republic, a 2019 Nigerian political drama film 
 Fourth Polish Republic, a campaign slogan used by Law and Justice in the 2005 parliamentary elections
 4K! – Fourth Republic!, a former left-wing Hungarian political part that existed from 2012 to 2016

See also

 First Republic
 Second Republic
 Third Republic
 Fifth Republic
 Sixth Republic
 Seventh Republic